The Khodynka Tragedy was a crowd crush that occurred on , on Khodynka Field in Moscow, Russia. The crush happened during the festivities after the coronation of the last Emperor of Russia, Nicholas II. While 1,282 corpses were collected from the scene, injury estimates range widely from 1,200 to 20,000.

Background 
Four days later, a banquet was going to be held for the people at Khodynka Field. In the area a town square, theatres, 150 buffets for distribution of gifts, and 20 pubs were built for the celebrations. Near the celebration square was a field that had a ravine and many gullies. On the evening of 29 May, people who had heard rumours of coronation gifts began to gather in anticipation. The gifts which everyone was to receive were a bread roll, a sausage, pretzels, gingerbread and a commemorative cup.

Crush 
At about 6 o'clock on the morning of the celebration day, several thousand people (estimates reached 500,000) were already gathered on the field. Rumours spread among the people that there were not enough beer or pretzels for everybody, and that the enamel cups contained a gold coin. A police force of 1,800 men failed to maintain civil order, and a catastrophic crowd crush occurred.

Death toll

A total of 1,282 corpses were collected from the scene, and the injured numbered between 9,000 and 20,000, according to different estimates. Another commonly cited figure reports "more than 2,600 casualties, including 1,389 deaths".

Most of the victims were trapped in a ditch and were trampled or suffocated there. Despite the tragedy, the program of festivities continued as planned elsewhere on the large field, with many people unaware of what had happened. The Emperor and Empress made an appearance in front of the crowds on the balcony of the Tsar's Pavilion in the middle of the field around 2 p.m. By that time the traces of the incident had been cleaned up.

Tsar's response 

A festive ball had been scheduled that night at the French embassy. When Nicholas heard of the stampede, "he did not display the slightest emotion and that night attended a ball given in his honor". Grand Duke Alexander Mikhailovich warned the tsar not to go to the French ball, but Nicholas II attended nonetheless. Li Hongzhang, China's Imperial Commissioner on a European tour, was the most notable witness. Li was amused and said a Chinese emperor would not have attended the ball.

The government distributed a large amount of aid to the families of the dead, and a number of minor officials were dismissed. The negligence and the tone-deaf response of the imperial authorities, however, caused further public indignation. "The radiant smile on the face of Grand Duke Sergei prompted foreigners to remark that the Romanovs lacked judgment," Grand Duke Alexander Mikhailovich wrote. Grand Duke Sergei Alexandrovich, then Governor-General of Moscow, became known as "the Prince of Khodynka" and the Emperor received the nickname of "Nicholas the Bloody".

Legacy

Leo Tolstoy was so moved by the tragedy that he wrote the short story "Khodynka: An Incident of the Coronation of Nicholas II".

References

Further reading
 Baker, Helen. "Monarchy discredited? Reactions to the Khodynka coronation catastrophe of 1896." Revolutionary Russia 16.1 (2003): 1-46.

External links 
 Memories of Alexei Volkov on the Khodynka Tragedy—view from inside the palace

1896 disasters in the Russian Empire
1896 in the Russian Empire
19th century in the Russian Empire
Disasters in the Russian Empire
Events in Moscow
Human stampedes in Europe
Man-made disasters in Russia
May 1896 events
Nicholas II of Russia